Deng Zhuoxiang (born 24 October 1988) is a Chinese footballer who plays as a midfielder for Wuhan Three Towns.

Club career
Deng Zhuoxiang started his football career in the 2005 league season playing for Wuhan Optics Valley; however, he would have to wait until the 2006 league season to make his debut against Tianjin Teda on 12 July 2006 in a 4–3 loss. Throughout the season, he would steadily establish himself within the squad by playing in 10 league games, though this was often as a substitute. By the 2007 league season, Deng would establish himself within the team and even score his first goal against Qingdao Jonoon in a 1–0 win on 27 March 2007. While now a regular starter for Wuhan, he found that they were controversially relegated then subsequently disbanded during the 2008 season after the club's management did not accept the punishment given to them by the Chinese Football Association after a scuffle broke out during a match against Beijing Guoan on 27 September 2008.

Without a club, Deng would be loaned to the newly promoted Jiangsu Sainty by Hubei F.A. at the beginning of the 2009 league season. He would go on to play in 29 league games in the season, scoring five goals and providing six assists. On 4 December 2009, he was named as the Chinese Football Association Young Player of the Year and would then transfer to Shandong Luneng shortly after. He would go on to make his debut on 24 February 2010 against Sanfrecce Hiroshima in an AFC Champions League game that Shandong won 1–0. In his debut season for Shandong, he would have to fight for his position against Wang Yongpo; however, he quickly established himself as an integral member of the team and aid the club to the 2010 league title by the end of his first season.

Deng transferred back to Jiangsu on 6 February 2012. However, Deng did not play during the 2012 season, missing out after doctors found fractured bone fragments in his knee. He was flown to Germany to get surgery and recover for most of the season. Deng finally made his debut for Jiangsu in the final game of the season, coming off the bench in a 1–1 draw against Guangzhou R&F. He would miss the beginning of the 2013 season with a fear of a possible leg inflammation. Deng returned in his first appearance of the season on 22 June 2013 in a 2–1 win against Shandong Luneng. He scored his first goal for Jiangsu on 19 October 2013 against Shandong in a 1–1 draw.

On 16 February 2015, Deng transferred to fellow Chinese Super League side Shanghai Shenhua. He made his debut for the club on 8 March 2015 in a 6–2 win against Shanghai Shenxin. Throughout the season Deng was limited to only three games after his 2012 knee injury made a recurrence. It was discovered that there was fragments of cartilage causing him discomfort and he needed more surgery on his knee. On 22 February 2017, Deng was loaned to China League One side Qingdao Huanghai until 31 December 2017.

On 28 February 2018, Deng transferred to China League One side Beijing Enterprises Group.

On 5 August 2020, Wuhan Three Towns announced his joining. In his first season with the club he would go on to aid them in winning the division title and promotion into the second tier. This would be followed by another division title win and promotion as the club entered the top tier for the first tine in their history. The following campaign he would be part of the squad that won the 2022 Chinese Super League title.

International career
Deng made his international debut on 18 July 2009 in a 3–1 win against Palestine. He would go on to be mainly used in friendlies until he was given a run of games in the 2010 East Asian Football Championship. On 10 February 2010, he scored his first goal in a 3–0 win against South Korea and help China beat them for the first time, ending the team's Koreaphobia. On 4 June 2010, Deng scored from a direct free kick in a 1–0 win against France, condemning the latter to a shock defeat.

Career statistics

Club statistics
Statistics accurate as of match played 11 January 2023.

International goals
Results list China's goal tally first.

Honours

Club
Shandong Luneng
 Chinese Super League: 2010

Wuhan Three Towns
Chinese Super League: 2022.
China League One: 2021
China League Two: 2020

International
China under-17 national football team
 AFC U-17 Championship: 2004

China PR national football team
 East Asian Football Championship: 2010

Individual
 Chinese Football Association Young Player of the Year: 2009

References

External links
 
 
 Player profile at Sohu.com 

1988 births
Living people
Footballers from Wuhan
Chinese footballers
China international footballers
Wuhan Guanggu players
Jiangsu F.C. players
Shandong Taishan F.C. players
Shanghai Shenhua F.C. players
Qingdao F.C. players
Beijing Sport University F.C. players
2011 AFC Asian Cup players
Chinese Super League players
China League One players
Association football midfielders